Vermont Route 5A (VT 5A) is a  state highway in extreme northeastern Vermont. It is an alternate route of U.S. Route 5 (US 5) that travels along the east shore of Lake Willoughby.

VTrans' 2006 Route Log lists the official length of VT 5A to be , with the last milepost reading at VT 105 in Charleston. However, VT 5A continues along a silent concurrency with VT 105 from Charleston to Derby Center.  The only mention of a concurrency between VT 5A and VT 105 is from VT 111 at its western terminus.

Route description

VT 5A begins in the south at an intersection with US 5 in the village of West Burke. Both routes connect Burke with Derby, but VT 5A uses a more direct, easterly route than US 5. VT 5A proceeds north into Orleans County and the town of Westmore traversing through the Willoughby State Forest and along the eastern side of Lake Willoughby before intersecting with the eastern end of VT 16.

History

While the designation of VT 5A has changed since its initial construction, its routing and function have not. The entirety of modern VT 5A was first designated as New England Interstate Route 2A (NEI 2A), part of the New England road marking system that existed between 1922 and 1927. NEI 2A was designated as an alternate to NEI 2, a designation which covered the entirety of modern US 5. When the New England Interstate system was supplanted by the United States Numbered Highways, NEI 2 was designated as US 5 in 1926 and NEI 2A was redesignated as a state highway.

Major intersections

See also
 
 
 List of state highways in Vermont

References

External links

 

005A
Transportation in Caledonia County, Vermont
Transportation in Orleans County, Vermont
Burke, Vermont
Westmore, Vermont
Brownington, Vermont
Charleston, Vermont
Derby, Vermont
U.S. Route 5